Helen Wyman (born 4 March 1981) is a British cyclist for the Experza-Footlogix team. She participates in both road cycling and cyclo-cross, and, since she began competing at the age of 14, Wyman has represented her country at many international events including World Cups and World Championships. Except for 2013, she was the British national champion in cyclo-cross from 2006–2015.

Major results

2003–2004
 National Trophy Series
1st Leicester
2nd Cheltenham
3rd Monmouth
2004–2005
 National Trophy Series
1st Leicester
2nd Ipswich
3rd Cheltenham
3rd Dudley
 2nd Overijse
 2nd Herford
 3rd National Championships
2005–2006
 1st  National Championships
 National Trophy Series
1st Cheltenham
1st Southampton
2nd Chorley
2006–2007
 1st  National Championships
 National Trophy Series
1st Cheltenham
 1st Verbania
 2nd Overijse
 UCI World Cup
3rd Kalmthout
3rd Hoogerheide
 3rd Veghel-Eerde
2007–2008
 1st  National Championships
 2nd Frankfurt
 UCI World Cup
2nd Milan
3rd Hoogerheide
 3rd Zeddam
2008–2009
 1st  National Championships
 1st Schmerikon
 1st Wädenswil
 3rd Tervuren
2009–2010
 1st  National Championships
 1st Döhlau
 1st Fae' di Oderzo
 1st Wetzikon
 1st Redmond
 2nd Strullendorf
 3rd Overall Gazet van Antwerpen
2nd Koppenberg
3rd Namur
 3rd  UEC European Championships
2010–2011
 1st  National Championships
 3rd Overall Gazet van Antwerpen
1st Koppenberg
3rd Oostmalle
 Fidea Classics
1st Niel
 National Trophy Series
1st Abergavenny
 1st Fae' di Oderzo
 1st Heerlen
 2nd Gavere
 2nd Zonhoven
 2nd Wetzikon
 3rd  UEC European Championships
 3rd Woerden
2011–2012
 1st  National Championships
 1st Ruddervoorde
 1st Baltimore Day 1
 1st Baltimore Day 2
 1st Gloucester Day 1
 1st Gloucester Day 2
 1st Breinigsville
 1st Burlington
 1st Rochester
 Gazet van Antwerpen
2nd Koppenberg
 2nd Surhuisterveen
 2nd Woerden
 3rd Gieten
2012–2013
 1st  UEC European Championships
 2nd Overall Bpost Bank Trophy
1st Koppenberg
2nd Essen
3rd Oostmalle
 1st Gieten
 1st Baltimore Day 1
 1st Baltimore Day 2
 1st Gloucester Day 1
 1st Gloucester Day 2
 1st Iowa City Day 1
 1st Iowa City Day 2
 1st Iowa City Day 3
 1st Providence Day 1
 1st Providence Day 2
 1st Rochester Day 1
 1st Rochester Day 2
 1st Breinigsville
 2nd National Championships
 UCI World Cup
2nd Plzeň
3rd Tábor
 2nd Middelkerke
 2nd Surhuisterveen
 2nd Heerlen
 2nd Woerden
 3rd Cauberg
2013–2014
 1st  UEC European Championships
 1st  National Championships
 2nd Overall Bpost Bank Trophy
1st Koppenberg
2nd Hasselt
2nd Ronse
2nd Essen
3rd Loenhout
3rd Lille
3rd Oostmalle
 1st Gieten
 1st Middelkerke
 1st Otegem
 1st Ruddervoorde
 1st Heerlen
 1st Baltimore Day 1
 1st Baltimore Day 2
 1st Williston Day 1
 1st Williston Day 2
 UCI World Cup
2nd Nommay
 2nd Gavere
 2nd Gloucester Day 2
 3rd  UCI World Championships
 3rd Brabant
 3rd Woerden
 3rd Providence
2014–2015
 1st  National Championships
 1st Baltimore Day 1
 1st Baltimore Day 2
 1st Brabant
 1st Gloucester Day 1
 UCI World Cup
2nd Cauberg
 Bpost Bank Trophy
2nd Ronse
3rd Hamme
3rd Lille
 2nd Hoogstraten
 2nd Middelkerke
 2nd Otegem
 2nd Ruddervoorde
 2nd Spa-Francorchamps
 2nd Providence Day 2
 Soudal Classics
3rd Niel
 3rd Providence Day 1
 3rd Woerden
2015–2016
 3rd Overall Bpost Bank Trophy
1st Hamme
2nd Antwerpen
3rd Baal
 Superprestige
1st Spa-Francorchamps
 1st Rucphen
 2nd National Championships
 2nd Surhuisterveen
 2nd Overijse
2016–2017
 1st Gloucester Day 2
 1st Iowa City
 Superprestige
2nd Hoogstraten
 2nd Baltimore Day 1
 2nd Gloucester Day 1
 3rd Baltimore Day 2
 3rd Breinigsville Day 2
2017–2018
 1st  National Championships
 DVV Trophy
1st Koppenberg
3rd Ronse
3rd Antwerpen
 EKZ CrossTour
1st Aigle
 1st Contern
 1st Elorrioko
 1st Manlleu
 1st Woerden
 UCI World Cup
2nd Bogense
2nd Zeven
 Brico Cross
2nd Bredene
 Superprestige
3rd Hoogstraten
 Soudal Classics
3rd Neerpelt
2018–2019
 1st Iowa City
 1st Ametzaga Zuia
 1st Abadino
 2nd Leudelange
 2nd Lutterbach
 3rd Overall Copa de España
2nd Elorrio
 EKZ CrossTour
3rd Aigle
 Toi Toi Cup
3rd Mlada Boleslav
 3rd National Championships
 3rd Rucphen

References

External links
Helen Wyman Official Website

1981 births
Living people
English female cyclists
Cyclo-cross cyclists
Sportspeople from St Albans